The 2019 Road to the Kentucky Oaks is a points system by which Thoroughbred fillies will qualify for the 2019 Kentucky Oaks, to be held on May 3. The field for the Kentucky Oaks, the filly equivalent of the Kentucky Derby, is limited to fourteen horses, with up to four "also eligible" horses in case of a late withdrawal from the field. The 29 races in the Road to the Kentucky Oaks will be held from September 2018 (when the fillies are age two) through April 2019 (when they have turned three). The top four finishers in the specified races earn points, with the highest point values awarded in the major preparatory races held in late March or early April. Earnings in non-restricted stakes act as a tie breaker.

Fillies who instead wish to enter the Kentucky Derby have to earn the necessary points in the races on the Road to the Kentucky Derby: points earned on the Road to the Kentucky Oaks are not transferable. However if a filly does earn qualifying points for the Derby by racing in open company, those points also count towards qualifying for the Oaks.

The Delta Princess Stakes, which was previously the 31st race in the series, had the 2017 running cancelled in the aftermath of Hurricane Harvey. It will not be part of the 2019 series.

The Santa Ysabel Stakes, which had previously been on the schedule, had the 2019 running cancelled in the aftermath of Santa Anita Park being closed as a result of an investigation into 22 equine fatalities at the track.

Standings
The following table shows the points earned in the eligible races. Entries were taken on April 29. Bellafina was the leading points earner after winning the Santa Anita Oaks and went off as the heavy favorite. However, she was upset by Serengeti Empress, who had qualified by winning the Pocahontas and Rachel Alexandra Stakes.

 Winner of Kentucky Oaks in bold
 Entrants for Kentucky Oaks in pink
 Did not qualify/Not nomininated/Injured/Bypassing the race in gray-->

Race results
The dates for some races shown below are based on the placement in the racing calendar from 2017/2018. Similarly, the purses shown for upcoming races are based on the amounts from the previous year and will be updated when finalized.

Prep season

Championship Series

See also
2019 Road to the Kentucky Derby

Notes

References

Kentucky Oaks
Road to the Kentucky Oaks
Road to the Kentucky Oaks